The 1944 El Toro Flying Marines football team represented the El Toro Marine Corps Air Station during the 1944 college football season. The station was located in Orange County, California, near the town of El Toro (later renamed Lake Forest). The team compiled an 8–1 record and was ranked No. 16 in the final AP Poll. Lt. Col. Dick Hanley was the team's coach. Cliff Battles and Jim Tuttle were assistant coaches.

Schedule

References

El Toro
El Toro Flying Marines football
El Toro Flying Marines football